Jane Petrovski (born 9 February 1985) is a retired Macedonian professional basketball player who last played for EuroNickel 2005 of the Macedonian First League.

Macedonian national team 
Petrovski has also been a member of the Macedonian national basketball team since 2004.

Achievements
 Hungarian League Winner - 2008
 Hungarian Cup Winner - 2008
 Macedonian Cup Winner - 2015

References

1987 births
Living people
BC Rilski Sportist players
KK MZT Skopje players
KK Rabotnički players
Macedonian men's basketball players
Soproni KC players
Sportspeople from Skopje
Guards (basketball)